Der Tod Jesu (The Death of Jesus) is an oratorio libretto by Karl Wilhelm Ramler. In its setting by Carl Heinrich Graun in 1755, it was the most often performed Passion of the 18th century in Germany.

The poem is part of the Empfindsamkeit movement of the 1750s. It is the middle of three oratorio texts by Ramler – Die Hirten bei der Krippe zu Bethlehem, Der Tod Jesu, and Die Auferstehung und Himmelfahrt – which may have been viewed by Ramler as a libretto cycle, though they were never set as a cycle by any composer. The libretto was intended for Graun but a copy of Ramler's text was somehow received by Telemann who produced his own setting of the oratorio (TWV 5:6) in Hamburg before Graun could perform the premiere in Berlin. Ramler revised his text in 1760.

The text is not a full retelling of the Passion of Christ and it does not quote Bible texts. Instead, it presents emotively various aspects of the Passion.

Settings
 Georg Philipp Telemann, Hamburg 1755, TWV 5:6
 Carl Heinrich Graun, Berlin 1755 – the best known of the settings; it was performed yearly in many cities in Germany throughout the second half of the 18th century. The Australian premiere of Graun's passion cantata took place on Good Friday 2012 in St John's Cathedral in Brisbane with the Badinerie Players and the Brisbane Chamber Choir under Michael O'Loghlin and with Shelli Hulcombe (soprano), Bethany Shepherd (soprano), Gregory Massingham (tenor), Jason Barry-Smith (bass).
Adolf Friedrich Hesse (1809–1863) composed an Organ Introduction, Op. 84, to Graun's work.
 Johann Christoph Friedrich Bach, cantata (1769) BR D 2 / Wf XIV:1, based on Ramler's revised version from 1760
 Joseph Martin Kraus to his own libretto (1776), in the Sturm und Drang style
 Anna Amalia, Abbess of Quedlinburg, used by Johann Kirnberger as models of counterpoint in his  (The art of pure musical composition) (1779)
 Christian Ernst Graf (1723–1804, The Hague 1802

Compositional style
Unlike Bach's Passions, Graun's setting does not imbue the tenor soloist with the role of narrator or Evangelist, nor is the bass cast as Vox Christi. The music is post-Baroque, an italianate galant style, and contains little counterpoint (notably in the duet, no. 17) or fugal movements (chorus no. 14 is a double fugue). Instead, it gives prominence to melody and voice. All arias are da capo arias with stylistic borrowings from opera arias. Grauner's recitative settings are highly expressive, culminating in the moving simplicity of the bass's recitative no. 23 on the death of Jesus, "" (He is no more!). The last chorus starts quite powerfully, but then ebbs away into a mystical silence.

Movements
Graun's settings consists of 25 movements:

Part 1
Chorale – Du, dessen Augen flossen
Chorus – Sein Odem ist schwach
Accompanied recitative (soprano) – Gethsemane! Gethsemane!
Aria (soprano) – Du Held, auf den die Köcher
Chorale – Wen hab' ich sonst als Dich allein
Recitative (soprano) – Ach mein Immanuel!
Aria (soprano) – Ein Gebet um neue Stärke
Recitative (tenor) – Nun klingen Waffen
Aria (tenor) – Ihr weichgeschaffnen Seelen
Chorus – Unsre Seele ist gebeuget
Chorale – Ich will von meiner Missetat
Recitative (bass) – Jerusalem, voll Mordlust
Aria (bass) – So stehet ein Berg Gottes
Chorus – Christus hat uns ein Vorbild gelassen

Part 2
Chorale – Ich werde Dir zu Ehren alles wagen
Recitative (soprano) – Da stehet der traurige, verhängnisvolle Pfahl
Duet (sopranos) – Feinde, die ihr mich betrübt
Recitative (soprano) – Wer ist der Heilige, zum Muster uns verliehn
Aria (soprano) – Singt dem göttlichen Propheten
Chorus – Freuet euch alle ihr Frommen
Chorale – Wie herrlich ist die neue Welt
Recitative (bass) – Auf einmal fällt der aufgehaltne Schmerz
Accompanied recitative (bass) – Es steigen Seraphim
Chorale with bass solo – Ihr Augen, weint!
Chorus – Hier liegen wir gerührte Sünder

A performance takes about  hours.

Selected recordings
 Telemann
 Ex Tempore, Le Mercure Galant. conductor . René Gailly
 Telemann Chamber Orchestra, conductor Ludger Rémy. cpo
 Graun
 Capella Savaria, conductor Pál Németh. HM Quintana
 La Petite Bande, conductor Sigiswald Kuijken. Hyperion Records 2003
 Das Kleine Konzert, conductor Hermann Max, cpo 2009
 Kraus – with Kom! din herdestaf att bära, Philharmonia Chor Stuttgart, Stuttgarter Kammerorchester, Helmut Wolf. Carus-Verlag 1997

References

Further reading

External links

Compositions by Carl Heinrich Graun
Oratorios
1755 compositions
Passion settings
Church cantatas
German church music